Urus-Martan (Ẋalxa-Marta or , Martanthi) is a town and the administrative center of Urus-Martanovsky District of the Chechen Republic, Russia, located on the Martan River. Population:

Geography
The town is located in the central part of the republic, to the southwest of the capital Grozny.

Climate
Urus-Martan has a humid continental climate (Köppen climate classification: Dfa).

Administrative and municipal status
Within the framework of administrative divisions, Urus-Martan serves as the administrative center of Urus-Martanovsky District. As an administrative division, it is incorporated within Urus-Martanovsky District as Urus-Martan Town Administration. As a municipal division, Urus-Martan Town Administration is incorporated within Urus-Martanovsky Municipal District as Urus-Martanovskoye Urban Settlement.

References

Notes

Sources

Cities and towns in Chechnya